The MCW Cruiserweight Championship was a professional wrestling cruiserweight championship owned by the Maryland Championship Wrestling (MCW) promotion. The title was created and debuted on November 8, 1998 at a MCW live event. The title is currently inactive.

The inaugural champion was Gregory Martin, who defeated Ronnie Zukko in the finals of a tournament to win the championship on February 12, 2001 at an MCW live event.

Title history

Combined reigns

Notes
1. – Each reign is ranked highest to lowest; reigns with the same number mean that they are tied for that certain rank.

References
General

Specific

External links
MarylandWrestling.com

MCW Pro Wrestling championships
Cruiserweight wrestling championships